Body and Soul (1931) is an American Pre-Code action drama film directed by Alfred Santell and starring Charles Farrell, Elissa Landi, Humphrey Bogart, and Myrna Loy. The story, adapted from the stage play Squadrons by Elliott White Springs and A.E. Thomas, depicts Royal Air Force pilots in World War I.

Plot
In World War I, American pilots Mal Andrews, Tap Johnson, and Jim Watson enroll in a Royal Air Force squadron. Mal and Tap are worried that their friend Jim is cheating on his new bride. When General Trafford Jones arrives to evaluate the squadron, he criticizes its lack of discipline and poor effort in aerial battles. Consequently, the general orders Watson to undertake a near-suicidal mission to shoot down an enemy balloon for his first flight with the squadron. Secretly, Mal joins him aboard the aircraft and when Jim is killed in the air battle, his friend manages to complete the mission and make it look like the dead pilot was a hero.

At the base, Jim's wife Carla is mistaken for "Pom Pom," his mistress. Mal falls in love with Carla and when Alice Lester, the real "Pom Pom", appears, she finds out that Tap is about to fly a mission. Lester is a German spy who sends the information to the enemy; Tap is killed as a result. When Mal realizes that Carla is Jim's widow and not his mistress, he sets off on another mission, with the hope that he will return to his true love.

Cast
 Charles Farrell as Mal Andrews
 Elissa Landi as Carla 
 Humphrey Bogart as Jim Watson
 Myrna Loy as Alice Lester ("Pom Pom")
 Don Dillaway as Tap Johnson
 Crauford Kent as Major Burke
 Pat Somerset as Major Knowls
 Ian MacLaren as General Trafford-Jones
 David Cavendish as Lieutenant Meggs (Dennis D'Auburn)

Production

Body and Soul began location shooting on November 29, 1930, at the Russell Movie Ranch in Agoura, California, with a modicum of flying. A Travel Air 4000 biplane that had been flown in Hell's Angels (1930), disguised as a British World War I fighter aircraft, was the only actual aircraft acquired for the production. A combination of flying sequences, matched to sound stage process shots at the studio where the Travel Air was again used, completed the aerial scenes. Production wrapped up on January 2, 1931.

Reception
The main attraction of Body and Soul was in the drama and the introduction of Elissa Landi to North American audiences. In Mordaunt Hall's review for The New York Times, he noted: "There are several effective flying episodes, but after all, the whole production hinges on the excellent portrayal of Elissa Landi." He also praised other actors: "Myrna Loy does well with the minor role of Alice Lester. Humphrey Bogart is earnest as Jim Watson, and Donald Dillaway acquits himself favorably as the valorous Tap Johnson."

References

Notes

Citations

Bibliography

 Maltin, Leonard. Leonard Maltin's Movie Encyclopedia. New York: Dutton, 1994. .
 Orriss, Bruce W. When Hollywood Ruled the Skies: The Aviation Film Classics of World War I. Los Angeles: Aero Associates, 2013. .
 Wynne, H. Hugh. The Motion Picture Stunt Pilots and Hollywood's Classic Aviation Movies. Missoula, Montana: Pictorial Histories Publishing Co., 1987. .

External links
 
 
 

1931 romantic drama films
American romantic drama films
American aviation films
American black-and-white films
1930s English-language films
Films directed by Alfred Santell
War romance films
Western Front (World War I) films
World War I aviation films
World War I spy films
Films with screenplays by Jules Furthman
Fox Film films
1931 films
1930s American films
Silent romantic drama films